Rudshur Rural District is a rural district (dehestan) in the Central District of Zarandieh County, Markazi Province, Iran. At the 2006 census, its population was 854, in 234 families. The rural district has 19 villages.

The rural district is also the location of Rudshur power plant, a 2162 MW gas-powered electrical plant off the Saveh-Tehran freeway.

References 

Rural Districts of Markazi Province
Zarandieh County